Elizabeth Almira Allen (1854-1919) was an American teacher, teachers' rights advocate, and the first woman president of the New Jersey Education Association. Allen was born in Joliet, Illinois, daughter of James and Sarah J (Smith) Allen on February 27, 1854, and the eldest of five children. By 1867 the family moved to New Jersey.

Allen advocated for teachers' pensions. In 1896, the first statewide teacher retirement law in the U.S. was passed in the New Jersey State Legislature.

References

External links

1854 births
1919 deaths
Schoolteachers from New Jersey
American women educators